Fit to Kill is a 1993 action adventure film starring Dona Speir, Roberta Vasquez, Cynthia Brimhall, Julie Strain, Bruce Penhall, Chu Chu Malave and Geoffrey Moore. It was written and directed by Andy Sidaris and it's the eighth installment in the Triple B series.

Plot
A security agency becomes involved in a violent conflict over possession of a rare diamond.

Cast
 Dona Speir as Donna Hamilton
 Roberta Vasquez as Nicole Justin
 Bruce Penhall as Bruce Christian
 Geoffrey Moore as Kane (as R.J. Moore)
 Tony Peck as Lucas
 Cynthia Brimhall as Edy Stark
 Julie Strain as Blu Steele
 Rodrigo Obregón as Mikael Petrov (as Rodrigo Obregon)
 Aki Along as Chang
 Ava Cadell as Ava
 Mark Barriere as Gregor
 Craig Ng as Po (as Craig Ryan Ng)
 Chu Chu Malave as Evel
 Richard Cansino as Kenevil
 Skip Ward as Skip
 Carolyn Liu as Silk
 Michael J. Shane as Shane Abilene (as Michael Shane)
 Brett Baxter Clark as Burke
 Sandra Wild as Sandy
 John Nelson as Emerson
 Nicholas Georgiade as Nick the Robber (as Nick Georgiade)
 Christian Drew Sidaris as Driver (as Christian Sidaris)
 Roy Summerset as German General
 Gerald Okamura as Commando
 Richard Rabago as Commando #2
 Don Yee as Commando #3
 Eric Anthony as Gunman
 Shawn Rooney as Shiwan
 Naida Albright as Female Commando
 David Parks as Doorman (as Dave Parks)
 Bill Perkins as Pawn Shop Owner
 Richard Palmer as Guard

References

External links
 

American sexploitation films
1993 films
1990s English-language films
American television films
American spy action films
Girls with guns films
Films directed by Andy Sidaris
1990s American films